Werneck is a surname. Notable people with the surname include:

Cassio Werneck, Brazilian martial artist
Franz von Werneck (1748–1806), Austrian military leader
Reinhard von Werneck (1757–1842), German garden manager
Tatá Werneck (born 1983), Brazilian actress, comedian, and musician